The Hiro Type 91, (full designation Hiro Type 91 520 hp water-cooled W-12), was a 12-cylinder, water-cooled, W engine developed for aircraft use by the Imperial Japanese Navy in the mid-1930s. Power was in the 450 kW (600 hp) range. Its design was derived from the Napier Lion. An enlarged more powerful engine, the Hiro Type 90 600 hp water-cooled W-12 had also been developed, producing 600 hp.

Applications
 Aichi E10A
 Aichi E11A
 Hiro H4H
 Kawanishi E7K
 Mitsubishi Ka-9

Specifications (Type 91 500hp-1)

See also

References

1930s aircraft piston engines